This is a list of glaciers of Nepal.

Glaciers

References 

Nepal
Glacier